Roads of Destiny is a 1921 American silent drama film produced and distributed by Goldwyn Pictures. The film is based on the 1909 short story of the same name by O. Henry that was turned into a play by Channing Pollock starring Florence Reed. Frank Lloyd directed and stage actress Pauline Frederick starred. The film is now considered lost.

Plot
As summarized in a film publication, David Marsh (Bowers), an inventor, is in love with Ann Hardy (Novak), but his brother Lewis also loves her. Lewis previously loved Rose Merritt (Frederick), but betrayed her and has cast her off. When he sees the success of David with Ann, Lewis reproaches his brother and threatens to end his own life unless he can marry Ann. David, overcome with these events, sinks into an armchair and falls asleep. In his dreams, the figure of Fate (George) appears and tells him that no matter which road he takes, he will find happiness with Ann and will marry her only. Then follow three dreams, one taking place in the North, one in the West, and one in his home town. When he awakes, he finds that Lewis was greeted with the same apparition and has decided to marry Rose, while David marries Ann.

Cast
Pauline Frederick as Rose Merritt
John Bowers as David Marsh
Richard Tucker as Lewis Marsh
Jane Novak as Ann Hardy
Hardee Kirkland as Mr. Hardy
Willard Louis as McPherson
Maude George as Fate
Maurice B. Flynn as Colby

References

External links

 
 

1921 films
1921 drama films
Silent American drama films
American silent feature films
American black-and-white films
American films based on plays
Films based on short fiction
Films directed by Frank Lloyd
Goldwyn Pictures films
Lost American films
Adaptations of works by O. Henry
1920s American films
1921 lost films
1920s English-language films
Lost drama films
English-language drama films